Snow White: A Deadly Summer is a 2012 American horror film directed by David DeCoteau and starring Shanley Caswell, Maureen McCormick, and Eric Roberts. The film was released straight to DVD and digital download on March 20, 2012.

Plot

Eve doesn't like her stepdaughter Snow getting in her way of being fully loved by her husband. Snow's stepmother talks to a reflection of herself which tells her what to do. With her reflection's persistence, Eve sends Snow to a camp for juvenile delinquents where they are killed off. As they are killed off Snow has dreams that show her the killings and give her clues into who the killer is and why it is doing what it does, but she has to be careful. Not everyone in the camp is as trustworthy as they seem and those who run it are hiding something.

Cast
 Shanley Caswell as Snow White
 Maureen McCormick as Eve
 Eric Roberts as Grant
 R.J Cantu as Bob
 Tim Abell as Hunter
 Chase Bennett as Cole
 Chelsea Rae Bernier as Lauren
 Camille Cregan as Mya
 Eileen Dietz as Lyla
 Aaron Jaeger as Sean
 Jason-Shane Scott as Mark
 Kelsey Weber as Sara
 Hunter Ansley Wryn as Erica
 Carolyn Purdy-Gordon as Dr. Beckerman
 Patrick Lewey as Jason

Production
Maureen McCormick, who was in The Brady Bunch, had her first starring role after a long time. McCormick said that her only problem was having to pretend that she hated the main actress, Shanley Caswell. The film has Snow White in the title because the main character's name is Snow and her evil stepmother wants her dead.

DVD release
The DVD was released in widescreen with a Dolby 2.0 Stereo mix. The special features are a commentary with the director and two cast members, production photos, and the film's trailer.

Reception
A Dread Central review said that the film could have been called Snow White and the Seven Delinquents or Snow White: A Deadly Dullness. Dawn Hunt of DVD Verdict thinks that the film fails most spectacularly on any expectations that viewers may have from Snow White being in the title.

References

External links

2012 horror films
American horror films
Films scored by Harry Manfredini
Films based on Snow White
Films directed by David DeCoteau
American independent films
2012 films
Direct-to-video horror films
2010s English-language films
2010s American films